GRW may refer to:

 Gary Railway, an American rail company
 Ghirardi–Rimini–Weber theory, in quantum mechanics
 Graciosa Airport, on Graciosa Island, the Azores
 Gujranwala railway station, in Gujranwala, Pakistan
 Gweda language, an Austronesian language